Necip Ugras (born 11 August 1967) is a retired Turkish-Swiss football striker.

Honours
Grasshoppers
 Swiss Super Cup: 1989

References

1967 births
Living people
Swiss people of Turkish descent
Grasshopper Club Zürich players
BSC Old Boys players
FC Chur players
Association football forwards
Swiss Super League players
Swiss men's footballers